The Gilda Stories is the 1991 debut novel of American author and activist Jewelle Gomez. Published in 1991, this speculative fiction vampire novel follows the experiences of a black lesbian heroine whose power and morality challenge assumptions about the vampire myth. Readers see this central character travel through time and lead multiple lives. In her first life, she is an unnamed runaway slave in Louisiana in 1850. After killing a bounty hunter in self-defense, she is rescued by Gilda, a vampire who runs a brothel named Woodard's. The women at the brothel educate her, become her family, and introduce her to vampirism and eternal life. Eventually, she becomes a vampire herself and adopts Gilda's name. The novel follows by providing historical vignettes of different cities and time periods, which highlight key moments in Gilda's life. She is in California in 1890, Missouri in 1921, Massachusetts in 1955, New York in 1981, New Hampshire in 2020, and the "Land of Enchantment" in 2050. This movement across time and space also situates the themes of blackness, sexuality, and female empowerment in various contexts.

Awards and honors 
The Gilda Stories is the winner of two Lambda Literary Awards (fiction and science fiction). Readings took place at the Museum of the African Diaspora and the Queer Arts Festival in 2011 to mark the book's 20th anniversary. Gomez's adaptation of the book for the stage Bones & Ash: A Gilda Story was performed by the Urban Bush Women in 13 U.S. cities.

References 

1991 American novels
Vampire novels
Fictional lesbians
1991 debut novels